William Bridgewater was an English footballer who played as a forward. Born in Parkgate, Rotherham he began his career with a short spell at Doncaster Rovers before moving across the Pennines to play for Newton Heath. Still an amateur whilst in Manchester he also appeared for Oldham Olympic and Gainsborough Trinity as a guest player during this period (as was allowed under FA rules) before returning to Doncaster Rovers.

Bridgewater was signed on professional terms by Rotherham Town in 1889 but was transferred to nearby Sheffield United in September 1890. Scoring a hat-trick in his debut game, he would go on to play in the Midland Counties League and the FA Cup for the Yorkshire club.  After one season at Bramall Lane he returned to Doncaster Rovers in the summer of 1891 before finishing his playing career at Hexthorpe, although he retained his links with United, acting as a scout for several years after his departure.
Bridgewater was also a professional boxer but injuries brought about his retirement from both boxing and football. He subsequently opened a gym in Doncaster where he became a boxing and wrestling promoter, managing two British boxing champions.

References

1886 births
1941 deaths
Footballers from Rotherham
Association football forwards
English footballers
English male boxers
Doncaster Rovers F.C. players
Manchester United F.C. players
Gainsborough Trinity F.C. players
Rotherham Town F.C. (1878) players
Sheffield United F.C. players
Midland Football League players